Anthidium clypeodentatum is a species of bee in the family Megachilidae, the leaf-cutter, carder, or mason bees.

Distribution
Middle America and North America

Synonyms
Synonyms for this species include:
Anthidium incurvatum Swenk, 1914
Anthidium emarginatum var bilineatum Schwarz, 1927
Anthidium clypeodentatum var lutzi Schwarz, 1928

References

External links
Images

clypeodentatum
Insects described in 1914